Seth Morris (born May 21, 1970) is an American actor, comedian, and writer known for his recurring roles on programs such as Go On, Happy Endings, The Hotwives of Orlando, The League, Kroll Show, and Childrens Hospital.

Early life
Morris is originally from Marin County, California, the younger of two boys, and attended Novato High School. After graduating, he began traveling and attended community college. He briefly attended University of California, Santa Cruz and took a six-month bicycling trip across the country, from San Francisco to Florida.

Morris has had numerous odd jobs including caretaking with developmentally disabled people at group homes, teaching kids, and working at a health food and yoga store in New York City.

Career
Morris started a career in comedy after moving to New York City, performing at the Upright Citizens Brigade Theatre (UCB) as an improviser and sketch comedian. He later moved to Los Angeles and became the first Artistic Director of the theater's Los Angeles division for many years and was a member of the four-man sketch group "The Naked Babies" with comedians Rob Corddry, Brian Huskey, and John Ross Bowie. After stepping down from that position, he started out as the first staff writer hired by Funny or Die.

He wrote and appeared with a recurring role on the Adult Swim series Childrens Hospital. Morris also recurred as Scotty on the ABC comedy series Happy Endings and as Danny on the NBC comedy series Go On. Other programs Morris appeared in regularly included Late Night with Conan O'Brien, the HBO sketch series Funny or Die Presents, and the MTV prank show Damage Control.

Morris has also made numerous guest appearances on comedy programs such as Curb Your Enthusiasm, Parks and Recreation, The League, Reno 911!, Crossballs, It's Always Sunny In Philadelphia, Maron, How I Met Your Mother, Broad City, Big Lake, Human Giant, and Nick Swardson's Pretend Time. He has appeared in films such as The Dictator, Step Brothers, Blackballed: The Bobby Dukes Story, and I Love You, Man. In 2012, Morris starred in the comedic web series First Dates with Toby Harris, produced by Yahoo! and Funny or Die.

Morris is a frequent writer and director for the humor website Funny Or Die. He is also known for his regular appearances on the Comedy Bang! Bang! podcast and television series, most often playing Bob Ducca, the hypochondriac ex-stepfather of host Scott Aukerman. Morris also hosted his own podcast on the Earwolf podcasting network, Affirmation Nation with Bob Ducca, which debuted in 2011, ran for 144 episodes, and stopped airing on February 29, 2012. As of October 1, 2014, Affirmation Nation released its first of a new run of episodes. However, on May 6, 2015 he published the last episode of Affirmation Nation. He wrote for the Comedy Central sketch series Kroll Show. Morris has also costarred in the Hulu series The Hotwives of Orlando.

Filmography

Film

Television

References

External links

Living people
Male actors from California
American male comedians
American male film actors
American male television actors
American male voice actors
Television producers from California
American television writers
American male television writers
Place of birth missing (living people)
American podcasters
Male actors from San Francisco
20th-century American male actors
21st-century American male actors
1970 births
Comedians from California
Upright Citizens Brigade Theater performers
Screenwriters from California
20th-century American comedians
21st-century American comedians